Cameron Arthur Rupp (born September 28, 1988) is an American former professional baseball catcher. He played in Major League Baseball (MLB) for the Philadelphia Phillies from 2013 to 2017.

Career

Amateur career
Rupp attended Prestonwood Christian Academy in Plano, Texas. The Pittsburgh Pirates selected Rupp in the 43rd round of the 2007 Major League Baseball draft, but he did not sign with the Pirates.

Rupp enrolled at the University of Texas at Austin and played college baseball for the Texas Longhorns. In 54 games as a freshman, he batted .309 with four home runs and 32 runs batted in (RBIs) and had a .990 fielding percentage. He was named a Freshman All-American by the National Collegiate Baseball Writers Association and Louisville Slugger. That summer, he played collegiate summer baseball for the Santa Barbara Foresters of the California Collegiate League. In 63 games as a sophomore, he hit .292 with a team-high 11 home runs and 46 RBIs during their College World Series runner-up season and was named to the All-College World Series team. That summer he played for the Cotuit Kettleers of the Cape Cod Baseball League and was named a league all-star. In 63 games as a junior, Rupp hit .304 with 10 home run and 54 RBIs.

Professional career

Philadelphia Phillies
The Philadelphia Phillies selected Rupp in the third round of the 2010 Major League Baseball draft. Rupp signed with the Phillies and was assigned to the Williamsport Crosscutters of the Class A-Short Season New York-Penn League. In 55 games, he hit .218 with five home runs and 28 RBIs. Rupp played for the Lakewood BlueClaws of the Class A South Atlantic League in 2011. In 99 games, he hit .272 with four home runs and 44 RBIs, and struck out 96 times.

Rupp played the 2012 season with the Clearwater Threshers of the Class A-Advanced Florida State League, where in 104 games, he hit .267 with 10 home runs and 49 RBIs. Rupp began the 2013 season with the Reading Fightin Phils of the Class AA Eastern League, where in 41 games, he hit .245 with eight home runs and 21 RBIs before being promoted to the Lehigh Valley IronPigs of the Class AAA International League in early June. In 53 games for the IronPigs, he hit .269 with six home runs and 24 RBIs.

On September 3, Rupp was promoted to the major leagues by the Phillies. In his first start, he recorded his first hit, off of Andrew Cashner, and later scored his first run. He started three games at catcher, and made one appearance as a pinch hitter. He hit 4-for-13 (.308) with two RBIs. After the season, he played for the Peoria Javelinas of the Arizona Fall League.

Rupp began the 2015 season as the Phillies' backup catcher, but by the end of June, with primary catcher Carlos Ruiz struggling and Rupp's performance starting to improve, Rupp began to see increased playing time.  On June 23, 2015, Rupp hit his first major league home run off New York Yankees pitcher CC Sabathia. When Ruiz was traded in 2016, Rupp officially became the Phillies starting catcher. He batted .217 in 2017, his only full season as starting catcher.

In January 2018, the Phillies and Rupp avoided salary arbitration by agreeing to a salary of $2.08 million for the 2018 season. Rupp was released by the Phillies on March 26, 2018.

Texas Rangers
On April 3, 2018, Rupp signed a minor-league contract with the Texas Rangers. On June 1, he exercised the opt-out clause in his contract and was granted his release.

Minnesota Twins
On June 4, 2018, Rupp signed a minor-league deal with the Minnesota Twins. Rupp was released on July 11, 2018.

Seattle Mariners
On July 16, 2018, Rupp signed a minor league deal with the Seattle Mariners. He elected free agency on November 2, 2018.

San Francisco Giants
On December 7, 2018, Rupp signed a minor-league deal with the San Francisco Giants that included an invitation to spring training.

Detroit Tigers
On March 8, 2019, Rupp was traded to the Detroit Tigers in exchange for cash considerations. He was released on May 13, 2019.

Oakland Athletics
On May 18, 2019, Rupp signed a minor league deal with the Oakland Athletics. He became a free agent following the 2019 season.

Cleveland Indians
On February 7, 2020, Rupp signed a minor league deal with the Cleveland Indians with an invitation to major league spring training.

Team Texas
In July 2020, Rupp signed on to play for Team Texas of the Constellation Energy League (a makeshift 4-team independent league created as a result of the COVID-19 pandemic) for the 2020 season.

Cleveland Indians (second stint)
Rupp signed a minor league contract with the Cleveland Indians on August 3, 2020, joining the Indians' player pool for the 2020 season. He became a free agent on November 2, 2020.

References

External links

 Cameron Rupp Texas Longhorns Player Profile
 

1988 births
Living people
People from Plano, Texas
Baseball players from Texas
Major League Baseball catchers
Philadelphia Phillies players
Texas Longhorns baseball players
Cotuit Kettleers players
Williamsport Crosscutters players
Lakewood BlueClaws players
Clearwater Threshers players
Reading Fightin Phils players
Lehigh Valley IronPigs players
Peoria Javelinas players
Round Rock Express players
Rochester Red Wings players
Tacoma Rainiers players
Toledo Mud Hens players
Las Vegas Aviators players